The main Italian clubs competition is the Serie A1 (english Serie A1 italian roller). It contains 14 teams.

History 
The italian championship was formed in 1922 by the first teams who subscribed to the newborn italian federation FIPR (Federazione Italiana Pattinaggio a Rotelle).

After 3 years the teams attending the national championship were divided into two different federations and none of them controlled by the fascist regime so that the national team wasn't representing nor being nominated by the regime.

The CONI's President Lando Ferretti decided to close both federations acting a forced merging of skating and hockey teams into the new FIPR supervising the programmed developing of the roller skating sport in Italy.

The "italian championship" turned into "National Division", new denomination adopted from 1928 to 1942. Season 1942 had been last played one before the Allied forces entered Italy during WW2.

At the end of the war the championship had been reestablished on a national basis changing the name and adopting Serie A as commonly used for the football national championship.

In 1982 the Serie A and Serie B teams decided to developing both championships by nominating a new organization in order to directly run press information and championship fixtures. This organization took same italian basketball name and purposes copying part of the name: Lega Nazionale Hockey Pista. Offices were settled in Monza up to season 1986-1987. At the beginning of season 1987-1988 offices moved to Milan just to find a closer location suitable to air and railway main transport stations. The board of direction opted for the Stazione Centrale, in Via Ponte Seveso, just 100 meters away the railway station.

The board decided to change "Serie A" and "Serie B" into "Serie A1" and "Serie A2", leaving "Serie B" for the lower inter regional championships - the former "Serie C".

Serie A1 and Serie A2 are still the names of the top italian championships, but the "Lega Nazionale Hockey Pista" is no more organizing them because FIHP decided to close the milanese offices in 2018.

Competition format

Regular season 
The first stage (stagione regolare) is played as a regular league with each of the 14 teams playing each other home and away. A win is worth 3 points and a draw one. The last three teams are relegated to the Serie A2.

Play-out 
The 11th and 12th placed teams face two teams from the Serie A2 in a best-out-of-3 series. The winners remain in the top league.

Championship play-off 
The first eight placed teams of the regular season fight for the championship in an elimination format in a best-out-of-3 series. The final is played in a best-out-of-5 format with the winner claiming the national championship.

Champions

Wins by team
Extinct clubs in italics.

External links
Official website
HockeyPista, one of best websites of roller hockey in Italian
Italian forum of roller hockey

Recurring sporting events established in 1922
Roller hockey in Italy
Roller Hockey
Italy
Roller Hockey

ca:Lliga italiana d'hoquei sobre patins
fr:Championnat d'Italie de rink hockey
gl:Liga italiana de hóckey a patíns
it:Serie A1 (hockey su pista)
pt:Campeonato Italiano de Hóquei em Patins